WGNK (88.3 FM) is a non-commercial, listener supported radio station broadcasting a Spanish Contemporary Christian music format. Licensed to Pennsuco, Florida, United States, the station serves the Miami area. The station is currently owned by Grupo Génesis. It was also broadcast on WPAT-FM (HD2).

External links

GNK
Radio stations established in 1992
1992 establishments in Florida